1848 in sports describes the year's events in world sport.

Baseball
Events
 First publication of the Knickerbocker rules.

Boxing
Events
 William Thompson retains the Championships of England but there is no record of any fights involving him in 1848.

Cricket
Events
 18 July — birth in Gloucestershire of W. G. Grace, who will dominate cricket to the end of the 19th century and be hailed as The Great Cricketer
England
 Most runs – George Parr 339 @ 18.83 (HS 52)
 Most wickets – William Hillyer 85 @ 7.28 (BB 8–26)

Football
Events
 According to the recollections of Henry Charles Malden, a set of rules is created for use at the University of Cambridge, drawing features from the different public school games.

Horse racing
England
 Grand National – Chandler
 1,000 Guineas Stakes – Canezou 
 2,000 Guineas Stakes – Flatcatcher
 The Derby – Surplice
 The Oaks – Cymba
 St. Leger Stakes – Surplice

Lacrosse
Events
 Montreal's Olympic Club plays a match against an indigenous team.

Rowing
The Boat Race
 The Oxford and Cambridge Boat Race is not held this year
Other events
 Henry Clasper builds the first keelless racing boats and spoon shaped oars, and develops the outrigger.

References

 
Sports by year